US Post Office-Fulton is a historic post office building located at Fulton in Oswego County, New York.  It was built in 1912-1915 and enlarged in 1936–1938.  It is one of a number of post offices in New York State designed by the Office of the Supervising Architect of the Treasury Department, James Knox Taylor. It is a two-story building with a limestone facade that contains a six-part colonnade with attached Doric order columns set in antis between Doric piers in the Greek Revival style.  The lobby features a mural by Caroline S. Rohland in 1942 titled "Father LeMoyne Trying to Convert the Indians on Pathfinder Island."

It was listed on the National Register of Historic Places in 1989.

References

Fulton
Greek Revival architecture in New York (state)
Government buildings completed in 1915
Buildings and structures in Oswego County, New York
National Register of Historic Places in Oswego County, New York